Dicyrtomidae is a family of Collembola in the order Symphypleona, and it is the only family of the superfamily Dicyrtomoidea. It includes more than 200 species in eight genera.

Genera 
According to Checklist of the Collembola of the World:

 Dicyrtominae Börner, 1906
 Calvatomina Yosii, 1966
 Dicyrtoma Bourlet, 1842
 Dicyrtomina Börner, 1903
 Gibberathrix Uchida, 1952
 Jordanathrix Bretfeld & Arbea, 1999
 Ptenothricinae Richards, 1968
 Bothriovulsus Richards, 1968
 Papirioides Folsom, 1924
 Ptenothrix Börner, 1906

References 

 Börner, 1906 : Das System der Collembolen nebst Beschreibung neuer Collembolen des Hamburger Naturhistorischen Museums. Mitteilungen aus dem Naturhistorischen Museum in Hamburg,  (texte intégral).
 Gao, Yan; Bu, Yun & Luan, Yun-Xia (2008): Phylogenetic Relationships of Basal Hexapods Reconstructed from Nearly Complete 18S and 28S rRNA Gene Sequences. Zool. Sci. 25(11): 1139-1145.   (HTML abstract)

External links 
 

Collembola
Arthropod families